Philander may mean:

 to have sexual intercourse with many women
 Philander (genus), a genus of opossums
 "Philander", a historic name for the dusky pademelon (Thylogale brunii)
Philander (mythology)

People with the given name Philander
 Philander Chase (1775–1852), Episcopal Church bishop, educator, founder of Kenyon College, and pioneer of the United States western frontier
 Philander Claxton (1862–1957), American journalist
 Philander P. Humphrey (1823–1862), American physician and politician.
 Philander Chase Johnson (1866–1939), American journalist
 Philander C. Knox (1853–1921), American lawyer and politician
 Philander Prescott (1801–1862), American translator
 Philander Smith (1809–1882), American philanthropist and eponym of Philander Smith College
 Philander Stephens (1788–1861), Jacksonian member of the U.S. House of Representatives from Pennsylvania

People with the surname Philander
 David Philander (born 1987) Namibia rugby union player
 Luke Philander (born 1997), South African cricketer
 Vernon Philander (born 1985), South African cricketer
 Wendy Philander, South African politician

See also
Philando, given name